Aseminun (also Romanized as Āsemīnūn) is a village in Nowdezh Rural District, Aseminun District, Manujan County, Kerman Province, Iran. At the 2006 census, its population was 174, in 39 families.

References 

Populated places in Manujan County